Remote Radar Head Neatishead or RRH Neatishead is an air defence radar station operated by the Royal Air Force.

It was established during the Second World War and consists of the main technical site, and a number of remote, and sometimes unmanned sites.

History 
The site was previously known as RAF Neatishead and its primary function was as a "Control and Reporting Centre" (CRC) for the south of the United Kingdom.

Equipment previously located in the base included: Type 7 GCI, AN/FPS-6 height finding radar, Type 80 "Green Garlic" radar, Type 84 radar, Type 85 "Blue Yeoman" radar, 3 Decca (later Plessey) HF200 height finding radars, and a R15 radar.

On 16 February 1966 a fire broke out in the bunker, station fire teams were unsuccessful in putting the fire out and so civilian fire crews were called. Three civilian firefighters died and the fire burned for nine days before it was fully extinguished. Later that year, LAC Cheeseman was sentenced to seven years for starting the fire and causing the deaths. The station was closed for eight years, re-opening in 1974 after a major rebuild of the bunker complex. The operational nature of the work undertaken at Neatishead was transferred to the previously mothballed site at RAF Bawdsey in 1966, with Bawdsey reverting to a care and maintenance programme when Neathishead came back on line in 1974.

In November 1982, Group Captain Joan Hopkins took command of the station, becoming the first female RAF officer to take command of an operational station.

In April 2004 the decision was taken to substantially reduce activities at RAF Neatishead, and by 2006, the base had been downgraded to Remote Radar Head (RRH) status, but the museum remains open.  The gate guardian, a Phantom previously based at RAF Wattisham, was cut up for scrap in 2005 despite interest from the Radar Museum.

In October 2006 local media reported that a buyer had been found for the now disused section of the base. The 25 1/2 acres site was advertised again in January 2010, with an asking price of £4,000,000. The site was subsequently purchased for an undisclosed amount by Zimbabwean-born British entrepreneur William Sachiti.

Operations 
RRH Neatishead controls the remote site of RRH Trimingham with its Lockheed TPS 77 Radar. It forms part of the UK's air defences – namely the UK "Air Surveillance And Control System" (ASACS), and is part of the larger NATO air defence.

Neatishead is adjacent to the RAF Air Defence Radar Museum.

The station motto is Caelum Tuemur, meaning "We Watch over the Sky".  The station badge depicts the lowered head of a horned bull; and relates to the origins of the word "Neatishead", meaning "the vassal's household".

In July 2022, it was announced that the radar at RAF Trimingham would be moved 8 miles (13 km) to RAF Neatishead due to the threat of coastal erosion and the increased interference experienced by operators from the off-shore wind turbines, the move is expected to be completed by the end of 2023.

See also
Improved United Kingdom Air Defence Ground Environment – UK air defence radar system in the UK between the 1990s and 2000s
Linesman/Mediator – UK air defence radar system in the UK between the 1960s and 1984
List of Royal Air Force stations
NATO Integrated Air Defense System

References

External links
RAF Neatishead official website (archived)
RAF Air Defence Radar Museum

Military units and formations established in 1941
Royal Air Force stations in Norfolk